Theodor van Kessel, Theodoor van Kessel or Theodorus van Kessel (1620 – 1696) was an engraver active in the Dutch Republic, Rome and Antwerp. He was one of the engravers who collaborated on the Theatrum Pictorium of David Teniers the Younger.

Life
Little is known of his early life.  He may have worked in Utrecht in the Dutch Republic around 1638, although this may have been an artist with the same name.  He is recorded as working in Rome where he inscribed his name in the catacombs of Domitilla, in the crypt of David. His presence in Antwerp is firmly established in 1652 where he was active until around 1660.

Work
He is known for several series of prints after other artists; among them are 10 plates of animals he made in 1654 for Jan van den Hecke entitled Alcune Animali. Van den Hecke was at the time court painter and curator for the governor of the Habsburg Netherlands, the Archduke Leopold Wilhelm. After van den Hecke died, Teniers succeeded him in the position of court painter and curator. This is probably how van Kessel came to work for him.

Selected works

References

External links

1620 births
1696 deaths
Flemish engravers